Luise Millerin is a 1922 German historical film directed by Carl Froelich and starring Lil Dagover, Paul Hartmann and Walter Janssen. It is based on the play Intrigue and Love by Friedrich Schiller.

Cast
 Lil Dagover as Luise Millerin  
 Paul Hartmann as Ferdinand  
 Walter Janssen as Fürst von Anspach  
 Gertrude Welcker as Lady Emilie Milford  
 Friedrich Kühne as Präsident  
 Fritz Kortner as Miller  
 Werner Krauss as Sekretär Wurm  
 Ilka Grüning as Millerin 
 Reinhold Schünzel as Hofmarschall Kalb

References

 Hardt, Ursula. From Caligari to California: Erich Pommer's life in the International Film Wars. Berghahn Books, 1996.

Bibliography
 Eric Rentschler. German Film & Literature. Routledge, 2013.

External links

1922 films
Films of the Weimar Republic
Films directed by Carl Froelich
German silent feature films
German historical films
1920s historical films
Films set in the 18th century
Films based on works by Friedrich Schiller
Films produced by Erich Pommer
German black-and-white films
UFA GmbH films
1920s German films